The Robert Award for Best Foreign Film was an award presented by the Danish Film Academy at the annual Robert Awards ceremony between 1984 and 1996, bar 1988 and 1989.

The award was succeeded by the Robert Award for Best Non-American Film (from 1997) and the Robert Award for Best American Film (from 1999).

Honorees

1980s 
 1984: Sophie's Choice – Alan J. Pakula
 1985: Amadeus – Miloš Forman
 1986: False as Water – Hans Alfredson
 1987: My Life as a Dog – Lasse Hallström
 1988: Not awarded
 1989: Not awarded

1990s 
 1990: A Short Film About Killing – Krzysztof Kieślowski
 1991: Cinema Paradiso – Giuseppe Tornatore
 1992: Dances with Wolves – Kevin Costner
 1993: Strictly Ballroom – Baz Luhrmann
 1994: The Piano – Jane Campion
 1995: Remains of the Day – James Ivory
 1996: Smoke – Wayne Wang

References

External links 
  

1984 establishments in Denmark
Awards established in 1984
Awards for best film
Foreign Film
Awards disestablished in 1997
1997 disestablishments in Denmark